Trachelipus nodulosus is a species of woodlouse in the genus Trachelipus belonging to the family Trachelipodidae that can be found in Austria, Czech Republic, Germany, Hungary, Poland, Romania, Slovakia, and in all states of former Yugoslavia (except for North Macedonia and Slovenia). It is found in the soil, under grass.

References

External links

Trachelipodidae
Woodlice of Europe
Crustaceans described in 1838